The 2019 Summit League women's soccer tournament was the postseason women's soccer tournament for the Summit League held on November 7 and 9, 2019. The three-match tournament took place at Fishback Soccer Park in Brookings, South Dakota. The four-team single-elimination tournament consisted of two rounds based on seeding from regular season conference play. The Denver Pioneers were the defending champions, and were unable to defend their title losing to South Dakota State on penalties in the final.  The win earned South Dakota State the conference's automatic bid to the NCAA tournament. The tournament win was Denver's fifth as a member of the conference, and the first for coach Brock Thompson.

Bracket

Source:

Schedule

Semifinals

Final

Statistics

Goalscorers 
2 Goals
 Sami Feller (Denver)

1 Goal
 Hannah Adler (Denver)
 Cecilia Limongi (South Dakota State)
 Leah Manuleleua (South Dakota State)

Own Goals
 North Dakota vs. Denver

All-Tournament team

Source:

MVP in bold

See also 
 Summit League
 2019 NCAA Division I women's soccer season
 2019 NCAA Division I Women's Soccer Tournament
 2019 Summit League Men's Soccer Tournament

References 

Summit League Women's Soccer Tournament
2019 Summit League women's soccer season